Zhang Linli (born 6 March 1973 in Shenyang) is a retired Chinese long-distance runner who set world class times in events ranging from 1500 metres up to the marathon. She broke the world record in the women's 3000 metres on 12 September 1993.

International competitions

Personal bests

See also
China at the World Championships in Athletics

References

1973 births
Living people
Chinese female long-distance runners
Asian Games gold medalists for China
Asian Games medalists in athletics (track and field)
Athletes (track and field) at the 1994 Asian Games
World Athletics Championships athletes for China
World Athletics Championships medalists
World record setters in athletics (track and field)
Medalists at the 1994 Asian Games
Athletes from Shenyang
Runners from Liaoning